A scleroscope is a device used to measure rebound hardness.  It consists of a steel ball dropped from a fixed height.  The device was invented in 1907.  As an improvement on this rough method, the Leeb Rebound Hardness Test, invented in the 1970s, uses the ratio of impact and rebound velocities (as measured by a magnetic inducer) to determine hardness.

See also

External links
 Mechanical Properties of Metals
 Scleroscope Hardness Test
 Testing the Hardness of Metals 

Hardness instruments
Materials science
Metallurgy